The Faculty of Geodesy at the University of Zagreb (Croatian: Geodetski fakultet Sveučilišta u Zagrebu) is the only Croatian institution providing high education in Geomatics engineering and the largest faculty in this domain in southeastern Europe.

Education

Since the implementation of the Bologna process in the academic year 2005/06, Faculty of Geodesy offers one undergraduate programme (three years):

 Geodesy and Geoinformatics

which finishes with the title Bachelor of Science in Geodesy and Geoinformatics. After receiving the B.Sc. degree, the student can apply for the Master's degree in two programmes (two years):

 Geodesy
 Geoinformatics

which ends with the title Master of Science in Geodesy or Master of Science in Geoinformatics.

The Faculty offers also two postgraduate programmes:

 PhD (three years)
 spec. (one year)

Organisation
The Faculty comprises 16 departments:

 Chair of State survey
 Chair of Geoinformation Science
 Chair of Hydrography
 Chair of Mathematics and Physics
 Chair of Analysis and processing of geodetic measurements
 Chair of Satellite geodesy
 Chair of Photogrammetry and Remote sensing
 Chair for Geoinformation
 Chair of Cartography
 Chair of Instrumental technology
 Chair of Engineering Geodesy
 Chair for Theory of Organisation and Management
 Chair of Spatial Information Management
 Chair of Land Surveying
 Laboratory of Measuring and Measuring technology
 Hvar Observatory

Students

Students are organised in their student association (Croatian: Studentski zbor) and are participating in few sport activities. Also, they issue the professional magazine Ekscentar.

Noted alumni
 Stjepan Horvat, Rector of University of Zagreb (1944–1945)
 Slavko Macarol, Rector of University of Zagreb (1963–1966)

External links 
  Faculty of Geodesy, University of Zagreb

Geodesy organizations
Geodesy
Donji grad, Zagreb
1962 establishments in Croatia
Educational institutions established in 1962